This is a list of child actors from Japan. Films and/or television series they appeared in are mentioned only if they were still a child at the time of filming.

Current child actors (under the age of eighteen) are indicated by boldface.

A 
Jin Akanishi (born 1984)
Nekketsu Ren-ai Dou (1999)
P.P.O.I. (1999)
Kowai Nichiyōbi (1999)
Best Friend (1999)
Taiyō wa Shizumanai (2000)
Haregi, Koko Ichiban (2000)
Omae no Yukichi ga Naiteiru (2001)
Daiki Arioka (born 1991)
Scrap Teacher (2008)
Aiko Asano (born 1970)
Drifting Classroom (1987)
Mana Ashida (芦田愛菜) (born 2004)
 Mother (2010)

E
Rina Endō (遠藤 璃菜) (born 2005)
Chouchou-san (2011)
Piece – Kanojo no Kioku (2012)

F 
Kyoko Fukada (born 1982)
Ring 2 (1999)

H 
Ai Hashimoto (橋本愛) (born 1996)
Confessions (2010)
Rumi Hiiragi (born 1997)
 Kayō Suspence Gekijō: Kyūkyū Shitei Byōin 3 (1995)
 NHK asadora: Suzuran (1999)
 BS Natsu Yasumi Tokushū Astro Fantasy: Shichiyō Bitte (1999)
 Studio Park Kara Kon'nichiwa (1999)
 Shichiyōtte Nan!? (1999)
 Getsuyō Mystery Gekijō Katahira Nagisa Suspense: Card G-Men Kobayakawa Akane 1-8 (2000–2005)
 Suzuran - Shōjo Moe no Monogatari~ (released June 17, 2000, distributed by Shochiku)
 Spirited Away
 Yonimo Kimyō na Monogatari: Obaa-chan (2001)
 Netto Koshien (2002)
 Mokuyō Drama: Dōbutsu no Oisha-san (2003)
 Nashonaru Gekijō: Mito Kōmon 32nd season, 12th episode (2003)
 Nice Mototeki Ongakukan (2004-2005)
 Kinyō Jidaigeki: Hannari Kikutarō 2~Miyako Kōji Yado Jikenchō (2004)
 Kinyō Night Drama: Sky High 2 episode 7 (2004)
 Hontoni Atta Kowai Hanashi: Yūgure no Maigo (2004)
 Ultra Q: dark fantasy (2004)
 Yokohama Mystery: Akai Kutsu~Yottsu no Zō no Nazo Haha no Negai Ha Toki wo Koete (2004)
 Yokohama Mystery: Tsurumisen Monogatari ~Tankoro Densha Ga Iku~ (2005)
 Yokohama Mystery: Byōinsen Hikawamaru ~Senka no Roman Kōro~ (2005)
 Yokohama Mystery: Yokohama Kokusai Minakami Kūkō ~Minami no Shima he Tonda Hikōtei (2005)
 Kayō Suspense Gekijō: Boshi Kantei (2005)
 Hagure Keiji Junjō ha Final Start Supesharu (2005)
 Doyō Drama: Nobuta o Produce (2005)
 Getsuyō Mystery Gekijō Yamamura Misa Suspense (2005)
Ryōko Hirosue (born 1980)
Shota no Sushi (1995)
Takahiro Hōjō (born 1986)
Mayonaka wa Betsu no Kao (2002)
Miyu Honda (本田望結) (born 2004)
 Kaseifu no Mita (2011)
Maki Horikita (born 1988)
Densha Otoko (2005)

I 
Yui Ichikawa (born 1986)
Ju-on: The Grudge 2 (2003)
Riho Iida (born 1991)
Tensai Terebi Kun MAX (2002)
Sosuke Ikematsu (born 1990)
The Last Samurai (2003)
Miyu Irino (born 1988)
 Pretty Soldier Sailor Moon SuperS (1995)
 You're Under Arrest (1996)
 Ultraman Gaia: The Battle in Hyperspace (1998)
 Spirited Away (2001)
 PaRappa the Rapper (2001)
 Cromartie High School (2003)
 D.N.Angel (2003)
 Wolf's Rain (2003)
 Fafner in the Azure (2004)
 Kurau Phantom Memory (2004)
 Madlax (2004)
 Windy Tales (2004)
 Zipang (2004)
 Tsubasa Chronicle the Movie: The Princess of the Country of Birdcages (2005)
 Eyeshield 21 (2005)
 Starship Operators (2005)
 xxxHOLiC the Movie: A Midsummer Night's Dream (2005)
 Tsubasa Reservoir Chronicles (2005)
 Air Gear (2006)
 D. Gray-man (2006)
 Legend of Raoh: Chapter of Fierce Fight (2006)
 Futari wa Pretty Cure Splash Star (2006)
 Gin'iro no Olynssis (2006)
 Yomigaeru Sora - Rescue Wings (2006)
Takahiro Itō (1987–2009)
Andromedia (1998)

K 
Kanon Kasuga (春日香音) (born 2003)
Shōkōjo Seira (2009)
Seishiro Kato (born 2001)
Tenchijin (2009)
Haruna Kawaguchi (川口春奈) (born 1995)
Tokyo Dogs (2009)
Kie Kitano (born 1991)
14-year-old Mother (2006)
Ayame Koike (彩夢) (born 1995)
Always Zoku Sanchōme no Yūhi (2007)
Seiran Kobayashi (小林星蘭) (born 2004)
 Natsu no Koi wa Nijiiro ni Kagayaku (2010)

M 
Tamaki Matsumoto (松元環季) (born 1999)
 Kamen Rider Den-O & Kiva: Climax Deka (2008)
Hibari Misora (1937 –1989)
Tokyo Kid (1950)
Karen Miyama (美山加恋) (born 1996)
Mop Girl (2007)
Ayaka Miyoshi (三吉彩花) (born 1996)
Confessions (2010)
Suzuka Morita (born 1992)
Kamen Rider Decade (2009)
Sumire Morohoshi (諸星すみれ) (born 1999)
 Red Garden (2006)

N 
Yukie Nakama (born 1979)
Tomoko no Baai (1996)
Terumi Niki (born 1949)
Red Beard (1965)

O 
Nozomi Ōhashi (大橋のぞみ) (born 1999)
 Shiroi Haru (2009)
Suzuka Ohgo (born 1993)
Memoirs of a Geisha (2005)
Natsuki Okamoto (born 1989)
Aoi uta - Nodo jiman Seishun hen (2006)

S 
Akira Saitō (斉藤晶) (born 1995)
Ue o Muite Arukō: Sakamoto Kyu Monogatari (2005)
Maya Sakura (born 1998)
Mecha-Mecha Iketeru! (2009)
Rio Sasaki (born 2002)
Ryōmaden (2010)
Momoko Shibuya (born 1987)
Himawari (2000)
Mirai Shida (born 1993)
Joō no Kyōshitsu (2005)
14-year-old Mother (2006)
Kaori Shimizu (born 1983)
Serial Experiments Lain (1998)
Hana Sugisaki (杉咲花) (born 1997)
Kazoku no Uta (2012)
Fuku Suzuki (鈴木福) (born 2004)
 Marumo no Okite (2011)

T 
Hideko Takamine (1924–2010)
Tokyo Chorus (1931)
Makoto Takeda (born 1990)
Cutie Honey: The Live (2007)
Kanon Tani (谷花音) (born 2004)
 Zenkai Girl (2011)

W
Konomi Watanabe (渡邉このみ) (born 2006)
Youkame no Semi (2011)

Y 
Yūya Yagira (born 1990)
Nobody Knows (2004)
Riko Yoshida (吉田里琴) (born 1999)
 Oh! My Girl!! (2008)

List
Japan